Tōpi Pātuki (1810/1820 – 28 September 1900), baptised as Hoani Raena (John Reynold), was a New Zealand Māori leader, whaler, goldminer and storekeeper. Of Māori descent, he identified with the Ngati Mamoe iwi. He was born in Waipahi, West Otago, New Zealand in about 1810.

References

1810s births
1900 deaths
People from Otago
New Zealand gold prospectors
New Zealand people in whaling
New Zealand traders
Ngāi Tahu people
People of the Otago Gold Rush